Barbara Bradley may refer to:
Barbara Bradley Hagerty, American journalist
Barbara Bradley Baekgaard (born 1939), American fashion entrepreneur